Pete Sampras defeated Andrés Gómez in the final, 7–6(7–4), 7–5, 6–2 to win the singles tennis title at the 1990 Ebel U.S. Pro Indoor. It was his maiden singles title.

Boris Becker was the reigning champion, but opted to play at the Eurocard Classic instead.

Seeds
All seeds receive a bye into the second round.

Draw

Finals

Top half

Section 1

Section 2

Bottom half

Section 3

Section 4

References
General

Specific

1990 Singles
1990 ATP Tour